Saint-Étienne-du-Grès (Provençal: Sant Estève dau Gres) is a commune in the Bouches-du-Rhône department in the Provence-Alpes-Côte d'Azur region in southern France. The commune was created in 1935 from part of Tarascon. It is situated at the northwestern foot of the Alpilles. The French Protestant Pomeyrol Community has settled in the village since 1937.

Population

See also
 Communes of the Bouches-du-Rhône department

References

Communes of Bouches-du-Rhône
Bouches-du-Rhône communes articles needing translation from French Wikipedia